is a spinoff video game series of the Kamen Rider Series.


Games

Kamen Rider: Battride War 

 is a video game based on the Kamen Rider Series, released for the PlayStation 3 on May 23, 2013. Done in the style of Dynasty Warriors, the player controls one of the Kamen Riders as he battles through a series of enemies. The game mainly features the protagonists of the Heisei era of Kamen Rider, starting with 2000's Kamen Rider Kuuga and featuring up to 2013's Kamen Rider Wizard. Showa-era Kamen Riders were originally meant to be released as downloadable content, but only two alternate versions of characters were released instead. A limited edition of the game was released that has a soundtrack that includes the original theme songs from the TV series and films.

The game's story mode known as "Chronicle Mode" ultimately pits the Kamen Riders against their mortal enemies in a final showdown. In this game, many Heisei Riders had their memories sealed and altered by a former member of Foundation X, Callas (voiced by Hōchū Ōtsuka). Only Wizard who manage to survive the seal and alteration thanks to an entity known as Canaria (voiced by Miyuki Sawashiro, who also voiced Kiva-la). It is up to Wizard to break free and restore the Heisei Riders' memories.

The game's theme song is "Go get 'em" by the Kamen Rider Girls. The physical release of the single included a DLC code to access the Kamen Rider Wizard's All Dragon Figure in game.

Kamen Rider: Battride War II

 was released on June 26, 2014, and it features characters from the most recent TV series Kamen Rider Gaim as well as story scenarios based on the various Kamen Rider films, including the Movie Wars series. As with the original game, a limited edition version with the theme songs from the TV series and films was also released. The game was announced on February 6, 2014 in the Dengeki PlayStation magazine. In addition to the PlayStation 3, Battride War II was released on the Wii U. Kamen Rider Girls performed the game's theme song "Break the shell".

Many original cast members return for this game, including several new characters. Mitsuru Matsuoka of SOPHIA reprises his role as voice Kamen Rider Eternal, Musashi returns to voice Kamen Rider Caucasus, and Hiroyuki Watanabe returns to voice Kamen Rider Gaoh. Ken Matsudaira, who portrayed the historical figure Tokugawa Yoshimune in the film Kamen Rider OOO Wonderful: The Shogun and the 21 Core Medals, appears in the game as a new playable character. Kento Handa, who portrayed Takumi Inui in Kamen Rider 555, reprises his role for this game, having not appeared in the prior version.

Players have the option of setting up custom song playlists for the game's various characters. They can pick songs from their own PlayStation 3 and Wii U libraries or they can pick and choose songs from the game if they have bought the Premium TV & Movie Sound Edition.

A series of downloadable content campaigns were run for the game, featuring various new characters introduced during the broadcast of Kamen Rider Gaim, such as Kamen Rider Zangetsu Shin and Kamen Rider Gaim Kiwami Arms.

Kamen Rider: Battride War Genesis

The third title called  was announced in September 2015 to be released on February 25, 2016 for the PlayStation 4, PlayStation 3 and PlayStation Vita. It is part of the anniversary project to celebrate the Kamen Rider franchise's 45th anniversary, and will feature characters from both all Showa Rider TV series, Kamen Rider Drive and Kamen Rider Ghost after a year of hiatus during Kamen Rider Drives airing, as well as feature characters who were originally only NPCs and Assist Call characters in Battride War II and the Shōwa era Kamen Riders, which were absent from both previous installments of the game.

The game features an original story where the evil Shadow Moon, rival of Kamen Rider Black makes the first monsters each Kamen Rider has faced much stronger, killing him and other Kamen Riders before they truly have a chance to become heroes. He starts off with Kamen Rider 1, and with his death, the history of all Kamen Riders is rewritten. The only ones unaffected are Kamen Rider Ghost, as he is already dead, and Kamen Rider Den-O, who has the Den-Liner that can travel through time and preventing his history as a Kamen Rider from being rewritten. The two work together to save the Kamen Riders and restore the original timeline so Kamen Riders live to protect the world.

Kohei Murakami was announced to reprise his role as Masato Kusaka/Kamen Rider Kaixa from Kamen Rider 555.

Hiroshi Fujioka reprises his role as Takeshi Hongo, Kamen Rider 1, in the video game. First edition copies of the game will come with a DLC code to access a special mission pack and a special Shocker costumed version of Takeshi Hongo.

As part of the promotion of Kamen Rider Drive Saga: Chaser V-Cinema release, Kamen Rider Drive's Kamen Rider Chaser was announced to be a downloadable character, followed by Kamen Rider Ghost's Kamen Rider Specter and then Kamen Rider Ghost Toucon Boost Damashii to be released around Thursday, each weeks on March after two weeks of the game's release.

The game's theme is Tourbillon's song "Colorless Images", from their upcoming album The Decade: 10th Anniversary Best.

Gameplay 

The gameplay is similar those of Dynasty Warriors series. The player chooses a Kamen Rider protagonist and fights various mobs through levels in the form of a beat 'em up hack and slash game. The game features boss fights against powerful foes from the various Kamen Rider series, as well as their underlings which make up the majority of enemies in the game. The Kamen Rider: Battride War series made itself unique in that the player can change their characters' forms during battle, mimicking how the protagonists can change forms in Kamen Rider, as well as allowing the player to traverse the stage on their motorcycles or other methods of transportation. Player characters can also gather energy from fighting mobs throughout the levels in order to activate special finishing moves that transform the character into their more powerful Final Form (known as the "Strongest Final Form" in the later games) for limited periods of time.

In Battride War II, a tag team system called Assist Call was introduced to allow the player to temporarily summon an NPC character to join them for a special team attack. The second game also introduces the Ultimate Final Form Gauge, which can be filled mostly through the player's attacks while the player is in a Strongest Final Form state to transform into their most powerful Final Form.

In Battride War Genesis, the Final Form gauge system was changed such that it has two tier levels; at 50%, the player can only access the Strongest Final Form, and at 100%, the player can transform from Strongest Final Form to Ultimate Final Form. Genesis also updates the vehicle system, now called the Attack Blast system, allowing character to attack while on their motorcycle, car, or other mode of transportation (except the character uses flight and super running transportation mode) in the air, after riding straight through a ramp the character encountered. The Assist Call system was also updated into the Tag Partner system such that it summons an NPC controlled ally that stays around for a set period of time, instead of just being used in a single special move as in Battride War II.

Characters

Voice actors

The Kamen Rider: Battride War video games feature the voice over roles of the actors who portrayed the characters in the television series and films.

From Battride War
Kamen Rider Wizard: Shunya Shiraishi
Kamen Rider Beast: Tasuku Nagase
Phoenix: Atsumi Kanno
Kamen Rider Fourze: Sota Fukushi (Battride War - Battride War II)
Kamen Rider Meteor: Ryo Yoshizawa
Sagittarius Zodiarts: Shingo Tsurumi
Kamen Rider OOO: Shu Watanabe
Kamen Rider Birth (Akira Date): Hiroaki Iwanaga
Ankh: Ryosuke Miura
Kyoryu Greeed: Yu Kamio
Kamen Rider Double's left-half/Kamen Rider Joker (in Battride War Genesis - onwards) (Shotaro Hidari): Renn Kiriyama
Kamen Rider Double's right-half (Philip): Masaki Suda (reused voice clips in Battride War - Battride War II)
Kamen Rider Accel: Minehiro Kinomoto
Weather Dopant: Tomoyuki Dan (achieved gameplay voices and credits only in Battride War II - onwards)
Kamen Rider Decade: Masahiro Inoue
Kamen Rider DiEnd: Kimito Totani
Kiva-la: Miyuki Sawashiro
Super Apollo Geist: Kazuhisa Kawahara
Kamen Rider IXA (Keisuke Nago/2000s): Keisuke Kato
Kamen Rider Dark Kiva (Taiga Nobori): Shouma Yamamoto
Kivat-Bat the 3rd, Kivat-bat the 2nd: Tomokazu Sugita
Tatsulot: Akira Ishida
Bat Fangire: Keikō Sakai
Kamen Rider Den-O Sword Form (Momotaros): Toshihiko Seki
Kamen Rider Den-O Rod Form (Urataros): Kōji Yusa
Kamen Rider Den-O Ax Form (Kintaros): Masaki Terasoma
Kamen Rider Den-O Gun Form (Ryutaros): Kenichi Suzumura
Kamen Rider NEW Den-O: Dori Sakurada
Teddy: Daisuke Ono
Albinoleo Imagin: Takaya Kuroda
Kamen Rider Gatack: Yuki Sato
Cassis Worm: Tak Sakaguchi
Kamen Rider Blade: Takayuki Tsubaki
Kamen Rider Garren: Kousei Amano
Black Joker Undead: Ryoji Morimoto
Kamen Rider Ryuki: Takamasa Suga
Kamen Rider Odin: Tsuyoshi Koyama
Kamen Rider Agito: Toshiki Kashu
El of the Water: Kiyoyuki Yanada

From Battride War II
Kamen Rider Gaim: Gaku Sano
Kamen Rider Baron: Yutaka Kobayashi
Kamen Rider Ryugen: Mahiro Takasugi
Kamen Rider Zangetsu Shin (Takatora Kureshima): Yuki Kubota
Kamen Rider Bujin Gaim: Rikiya Koyama
Kamen Rider Sorcerer: Takanori Jinnai
Groundain: Kohki Okada
Skydain: Ayumi Kinoshita
Tokugawa Yoshimune: Ken Matsudaira
Kamen Rider Eternal: Mitsuru Matsuoka
Kamen Rider IXA (Otoya Kurenai/1986): Kouhei Takeda
Kamen Rider Den-O Wing Form (Sieg): Shin-ichiro Miki
Kamen Rider Gaoh: Hiroyuki Watanabe
Kamen Rider Caucasus: Musashi
Kamen Rider Faiz: Kento Handa
Kamen Rider Ryuga: Takamasa Suga

From Battride War Genesis
Kamen Rider Ghost: Shun Nishime
Kamen Rider Specter: Ryosuke Yamamoto
Yurusen: Aoi Yuki
Kamen Rider Drive: Ryoma Takeuchi
Kamen Rider Mach: Yu Inaba
Kamen Rider Chaser: Taiko Katono
Heart Roidmude: Tomoya Warabino
Mr. Belt: Chris Peppler
Kamen Rider Wiseman: Toshitsugu Takashina
Libra Zodiarts: Kousei Amano
Kamen Rider Kuuga (Yusuke Onodera): Ryouta Murai
Kamen Rider Zeronos (Yuto Sakurai): Yuichi Nakamura
Kamen Rider Zeronos Vega Form/Denebick Buster (Deneb): Hōchū Ōtsuka
Kamen Rider Hibiki: Shigeki Hosokawa
Kamen Rider Ibuki: Jouji Shibue
Kamen Rider Kaixa: Kohei Murakami
Kamen Rider Knight: Satoshi Matsuda
Pantheras Luteus: Jin Yamanoi
Kamen Rider BLACK/Kamen Rider BLACK RX: Tetsuo Kurata
Shadow Moon: Masaki Terasoma
Takeshi Hongo/Kamen Rider 1: Hiroshi Fujioka
Great Leader of Shocker: Tomokazu Seki

Reception

Famitsu gave the first game rating of 33/40. The game also managed to debut at the second spot of the Japanese Game Ranking for the week of May 20 to 26, 2013, selling 128,659 copies on its first week.

4Gamers reported that Kamen Rider: Battride War Genesis was one of the top selling video games for the week of February 22 to February 28, 2016, taking first, third, and fourth place in the week's sales on PlayStation 4, PlayStation Vita, and PlayStation 3, respectively, having sold over 77 thousand copies combined.

References

External links

 (Kamen Rider: Battride War II)
 (Kamen Rider: Battride War Genesis)

Kamen Rider video games
Eighting games
Bandai Namco games
Bandai Namco Entertainment franchises
PlayStation 3 games
PlayStation 4 games
PlayStation Vita games
2013 video games
2014 video games
2016 video games
Japan-exclusive video games
Wii U games
Single-player video games
Video games developed in Japan
Video games about parallel universes